John Butterworth (1727–1803) was an English Baptist minister.

Life
He was one of five sons of Henry Butterworth, a religiously-inclined blacksmith of Goodshaw, a village in Rossendale Valley, Lancashire; three of his brothers also became ministers of Baptist congregations: Henry was at Bridgnorth; James was at Bromsgrove; and Lawrence, who wrote two pamphlets against Unitarian views, was at Evesham. The other brother, Thomas, was also involved as a supply preacher. John was born 13 December 1727, and went to the school of David Crosley, a Calvinistic minister. 
 
About 1753 Butterworth was appointed pastor of Cow Lane Chapel, Coventry. With this congregation he remained half a century, and died 24 April 1803, aged 75.

Works
Butterworth published, in 1767, A New Concordance and Dictionary to the Holy Scriptures, reprinted in 1785, 1792, and 1809. The last edition was edited by Adam Clarke. The Encyclopædia Metropolitana considered it "for the most part, a judicious abridgment" of Cruden's Concordance.

He also wrote A Serious Address to the Rev. Dr. Priestley, 1790. This was published under the pseudonym "Christophilus", and attacked the Unitarian views of Joseph Priestley.

Family
His son Joseph Butterworth is known as a publisher.

Notes

Attribution

1727 births
1803 deaths
English Baptists
People from the Borough of Rossendale